If It Was That Easy is the second studio album by Canadian country music artist Bobby Wills. It was released on November 6, 2012 via On Ramp Records and distributed by EMI. The single "Somebody Will" peaked at number 91 on the Billboard Canadian Hot 100.

Critical reception
Richard Amery of L.A. Beat wrote that "Wills combines elements of Clint Black, Alan Jackson and Gord Bamford on a variety of upbeat, catchy country rockers which are definitely Top 40 country radio friendly."

Track listing

Chart performance

Singles

References

2012 albums
Bobby Wills albums